La Jolla Village is a mixed residential/business neighborhood in the coastal San Diego community of La Jolla. La Jolla Village Square and The Shops at La Jolla Village are in the center of the neighborhood and contain a variety of stores, restaurants, apartments, a post office and two movie theaters.

Geography
La Jolla Village is bordered by I-5 and University City to the east; Gilman Drive and La Jolla Heights to the west and south and La Jolla Village Drive, UCSD and Torrey Pines to the north.

Demographics
As of the Census of 2010, there were 5,783 people living in 3,283 households in La Jolla Village. The population density was 9,064 people per square mile. The racial makeup of La Jolla Village was 69.03% White, 22.10% Asian, 1.68% African American, 0.07% American Indian and Alaska Native, 0.03% Native Hawaiian and Pacific Islander, 2.80% from other races and 4.29% from two or more races. Hispanic or Latino of any race were 9.99%.

Education
La Jolla Village is served by Torrey Pines Elementary School (K-5) in La Jolla Heights, Muirlands Middle School (6-8) in the Muirlands, La Jolla High School (9-12) in the Beach-Barber Tract and University City High School (9-12) in University City.

The neighborhood is also adjacent to the University of California, San Diego campus.

Transportation
La Jolla Village is served by the I-5 and SR-52 freeways, several MTS bus routes and the Rose Canyon Bike Path. A Mid-Coast Trolley station is located on Nobel Drive on the west side of I-5.

Recreation
 Rose Canyon Open Space Park
 Villa La Jolla Park

References

External links
 La Jolla Village Wiki

La Jolla, San Diego
Neighborhoods in San Diego